"Don't Hang Up" is a 1962 hit single produced by Cameo-Parkway Records and performed by the American R&B music group the Orlons. The song is also credited under the Ariola Records label. The song was a number-four hit on the Billboard Pop chart and reached number three on its R&B chart. One of the group's biggest songs during their career, "Don't Hang Up" remains an icon of the early 1960s era of popular music and was awarded gold disc status for selling over one million copies.

Chart performance

Credits
Written by Dave Appell & Kal Mann
Executive producer: Bernie Lowe
Lead vocals: Rossetta Hightower
Backing vocals: Marlena Davis & Shirley Brickley
Support vocals: Steve Caldwell

Popular culture
The song achieved notoriety again in the 1990s, when it was included in the 1993 family comedy film Dennis the Menace.

References

1962 singles
American pop songs
American rhythm and blues songs
Songs written by Dave Appell
Songs with lyrics by Kal Mann
1962 songs
Cameo-Parkway Records singles
Songs about telephone calls